Tambaram is a state assembly constituency in Chengalpattu district, Tamil Nadu, India. Its State Assembly Constituency number is 31. It includes All Wards from Zone 4 and Zone 5, Wards Comprising the rest of the areas other than Hashinapuram and Nemilichery in Zone 3 of Tambaram City Municipal Corporation and Agaramthen, Madurapakkam and Kovilanchery Villages in St.Thomas Mount Panchayat Union. It forms a part of Sriperumbudur Lok Sabha Constituency for national elections. It is one of the 234 State Legislative Assembly Constituencies in Tamil Nadu in India.

The Paraiyar community is the biggest community in this constituency with around 40% population.

The population of other communities are: Vanniyar 26%, Nadar 10%, Reddy 5% and Muslims 4%.

In the 2021 MLA election, it is said that the DMK party's S.R Raja of Reddy community won with the help of Paraiyar votes.

In the 2021 MLA election, the AIADMK party's candidate was a Konar.

The percentage of Paraiyar and Vanniyar population of this constituency could be decreasing every year as people from various parts of Tamilnadu are emigrating to chennai city and its neighbourhood.

Members of the Assembly

Election results

2021

2016

2011

2006

2001

1996

1991

1989

1984

1980

1977

References 

 

Assembly constituencies of Tamil Nadu
Kanchipuram district